Si Yan (born 9 December 1989) is a Chinese team handball goalkeeper. She plays for the Anhui HC, and on the Chinese national team. She represented China at the 2013 World Women's Handball Championship in Serbia, where the Chinese team placed 18th.

References

Chinese female handball players
1989 births
Living people